Colin Mackenzie is an Australian poet and songwriter.

Awards
In 2012 Mackenzie won, with Alita Fahey, the Canberra Country Songwriting Award for Best Honky Tonk Song (Night Horses). The song The Boy from Cooroy (written with Alita Fahey, recorded by Brothers3) was a finalist in the Australian Songwriting Competition for Best Australian Song in 2014, and a finalist in the 2015 Australian Country Music People's Choice award.

Works
Dust on the Leaves, 2013
Lost lines: poems, songs, and photographs, 2015
Random Thoughts: A Collection of Poems and Songs 2016 (selected poems and songs from Dust on the Leaves and Lost Lines)
 Shannon O'Leary (2016) The Blood on My Hands: An Autobiography (editor)

References

Living people
Writers from New South Wales
Year of birth missing (living people)